Cenk Ahmet Alkılıç (born 9 December 1987) is a Turkish footballer who plays as a defender for Eyüpspor. He made his professional debut in 2006 with Beylerbeyi.

Career statistics

References

1987 births
People from Karşıyaka
Living people
Turkish footballers
Turkey B international footballers
Association football defenders
Galatasaray S.K. footballers
Beylerbeyi S.K. footballers
Altay S.K. footballers
Çaykur Rizespor footballers
Kayseri Erciyesspor footballers
İstanbul Başakşehir F.K. players
Alanyaspor footballers
Büyükşehir Belediye Erzurumspor footballers
Eyüpspor footballers
Süper Lig players
TFF First League players
TFF Second League players
TFF Third League players